Edmond L. Soliday (born April 3, 1945) is a Republican member of the Indiana House of Representatives, representing the 4th District.

References

External links
Edmond Soliday at Ballotpedia
Representative Edmond Soliday official Indiana State Legislature site
 

1945 births
Living people
Republican Party members of the Indiana House of Representatives
21st-century American politicians
People from Valparaiso, Indiana
Indiana University alumni